Fake? is a Japanese rock musical project led by vocalist Ken Lloyd. Originally a duo, guitarist Inoran left in 2005. Lyrics are mainly in English and sometimes in Japanese.

History
In late 2001 Oblivion Dust vocalist Ken Lloyd joined up with Luna Sea guitarist Inoran and formed Fake?. They didn't go public until early 2002, though, where the two of them held a secret two-day "Show Case" event at Liquidroom Shinjuku. A short time later they released their first single "Taste Maximum." They released another single, "Someday", and their first album, Breathe In..., which reached the top 30 in the Oricon charts despite a lack of promotion, major magazine interviews, or photo-sessions. Their respective musical influences can be heard throughout the album: slightly more trip hop songs were composed by Inoran, slightly more Punk rock songs composed by Ken. They took part at the Summer Sonic Festival 2002 in Tokyo, Osaka, and Hong Kong. They also played in gigs at Nagoya Diamond Hall, Osaka Namba Hatch and the Akasaka BLITZ. On November 2, the band started its Live Tour, performing seven concerts in five towns. The final concert of this tour, on November 24 at Zepp Tokyo, was later broadcast in Japan by WOWOW.

In January 2003 they released the album Tomorrow Today (with collaboration vocals of Kokia on the song "Care"). They toured for the rest of the year. Due to differences about the direction of their careers, they changed their label from Warner Music Japan to Tokuma Japan Communications.

In the beginning of 2004, they performed the concert Stepping Stone Extra Date, which was later to be released as their first DVD. On March 13, they released the mini album New Skin. Shortly thereafter, they released another single "Praise" (which was used as the opening theme of the television anime Aqua Kids) and another album titled The Art of Losing Touch. They began their Tour of Losing Touch, playing at six locations. The last event of this tour was on July 6 at the Shibuya-AX, where their Tour of Losing Touch DVD was recorded. Subsequent tours were titled Tour of Losing Touch: Live Like Billy (in direct allusion to the "Just Like Billy" single) and the Tour of Losing Touch: Final.

In 2005 they released the single "Pulse" (which was used as the second opening theme for the television anime Onmyou Taisenki) along with an English version, and released the album Made With Air. After the Tour of [?], Inoran left the band in October, due to musical differences. Ken Lloyd announced that the group would continue, and they soon released the Live Tour? Final at Shibuya-AX DVD which was recorded from the last live performance of Tour of [?] together with a best album titled simply Fake?

In mid-2006 they released Songs From Beelzebub (with the collaboration of the former Luna Sea member Shinya on some songs). Their Live From Beelzebub Tour finished its Japanese leg on July 4 at the Ebisu Liquid Room and was followed by a show at Pentaport rock festival in South Korea on July 29.

In late 2006 Marilyn Is a Bubble was released with contributions by Anna Tsuchiya, Hide and U-Ta (Buck-Tick), "Ali" (Monoral) and others. K.A.Z, "d-kiku" and "Shigeo" (Mold, the Samos) each contributed a remix song (a total of three), that were released on the internet as a bonus to those who bought the albums Songs From Beelzebub and Marilyn Is a Bubble. After the band's "Live With Marilyn" tour in early 2007, along with a concert on July 28 at the Ebisu Liquid Room in Tokyo, the band took a break because Ken Lloyd was  concentrated on the return of Oblivion Dust.

In early 2009 Ken Lloyd announced that a new Fake? album was in the process of being written. On June 12, 2009 the band performed in New Jersey, United States at AnimeNEXT, where Ken announced that he hoped to bring his music to the US by the next year.

On February 24, 2010, Ken released the third endeavor of post-Inoran Fake?, entitled Switching On X, under the label Music Taste and being produced by Martin Glover. A suspected lack of promotion, as later indicated by the band's switch in management, likely led to the album reaching the band's worst Oricon ranking ever; it topped a meager 203rd for only one week on the chart. Around the time of the album release, Ken Lloyd created his first English official Facebook page and Twitter account. On his Facebook page he answered questions from fans around the world in video messages.

In April 2012, Ken announced he was working on new Fake? stuff, then later confirmed this with news about a new album compilation entitled Fake? 2002-2012 Decade Selection under Tokuma Japan Communications, with this album to include an exclusive song called "Feel it" (a collaboration with Inoran).

In November 19 the band kept a gig at Daikanyama Unit in Tokyo, where they released an exclusive new EP called Nail. They announced a new gig on February 23, 2013 called "Fake? Live -Decade-" where Inoran would come back to play with Fake? live. This gig with Inoran was recorded and released as DVD on October 2, 2013.

Current support members 
 DJ Bass – DJ, also known as "Gyutang Clan", he started with Fake? in 2002 and has a solo career. He also collaborated with Inoran on his solo career in the last years.
 Mine – guitar, collaborator from 2009, also works with Anna Tsuchiya.
 Fire – bass, collaborator in 2009, also works with Sugizo
 Kife – programming, collaborator from 2009.
 Masuo – drums, he started with Fake? in 2008.

Early support members 
 DJ Uppercut – DJ (2002)
 Ju-ken – bass (2002)
 Hiko – bass (2002)
 Hasegawa Akihiko – bass (2003)
 Kaoru Noguchi – drums (2002 to 2006)
 Shibuya Ken – drums, he participated on the album Songs From Beelzebub in 2006 and was a support member in 2007.
 Morrissey – bass, (2003 to 2008), used to be the bassist for Camino. In the past, he's played support for Shuubi, Speena, and Breath and is currently playing in his own band, Stray Pig Vangard.
 Pablo – guitar, (2003 to 2008), previously in Giraffe in 1999. He was then a support guitarist for Fake? and Takui Nakajima. He is currently in Pay Money to My Pain and also he is Oblivion Dust support member.
 Eric Zay – guitar, (2006 to 2008), he's played support for Monoral, Sugizo, etc. Currently in his own band, Bloom Underground and also writes jingles for television. He is also one of the founders of independent record label Pure Records along with Casey Rankin.
 Rikiji – bass, collaborator in one gig at end of 2010.

Discography

Studio albums
 Breathe In... (July 10, 2002)
 Tomorrow Today (January 22, 2003)
 The Art of Losing Touch (June 23, 2004)
 Made with Air (June 17, 2005)
 Songs from Beelzebub (May 24, 2006)
 Marilyn Is a Bubble (November 22, 2006)
 Switching on X (February 24, 2010)
 The Lost Generation (September 17, 2014)

Mini-albums
 New Skin (March 17, 2004)
 Nail  (November 19, 2012) (limited EP for those who bought it on "Fake? Showcase III" gig at Daikanyama UNIT)
 Stone (June 23, 2013) (limited EP for those who bought it on "Fallen Angels" gig at Daikanyama UNIT)
 Together (September 29, 2013) (limited EP for those who bought it on "Grind-A-Go-Go" gig at Daikanyama UNIT)

Compilations
 Fake? Best Album (December 21, 2005)
 Fake? 2002-2012 Decade Selection (August 1, 2012)

Singles
 "Taste Maximum" (February 27, 2002)
 "Someday" (May 22, 2002)
 "Here We Go" (December 11, 2002)
 "Praise" (April 21, 2004)
 "Just Like Billy" (November 25, 2004)
 "Pulse" (March 16, 2005)
 "Pulse" -English Version- (April 1, 2005)
 "Addicted" (February 25, 2015)
 "White Rabbit Inc" (December 6, 2016)

DVDs
 Stepping Stone Extra Date (June 3, 2004)
 www.hedfuc.com (November 25, 2004)
 Tour of Losing Touch Shibuya-Ax (December 22, 2004)
 Live Tour ? Final at Shibuya-Ax (December 21, 2005)
 Live From Beelzebub Tour (November 22, 2006)
 Used to Be a Bad Thing's PV (limited DVD for those who attended any gig of "Live with Marilyn" in early 2007)
 Fake -Decade Live- (October 2, 2013)

Bonus songs
 "Disco" (Death Club mix) remixed by K.A.Z
 "Retina" (Dilated Pupils mix) remixed by "Shigeo" (Mold, the Samos)
 "Closer to Marilyn" (The Other Dimension) remixed by "d-kiku"

References

External links
 Official website
 Official Facebook
 Official Twitter
 Official MySpace

Japanese alternative rock groups
Japanese electronic rock musical groups
Musical groups established in 2001
Musical groups from Tokyo
Tokuma Japan Communications artists